Kuzhalmannam (Kozhalmannam, Coyalmannam, കുഴൽമന്ദം ) is a gram panchayat in the Palakkad district, state of Kerala, India. It is a local government organisation that serves the villages of Kuzhalmannam-I and Kuzhalmannam-II.

Pictures

References 

Gram panchayats in Palakkad district